Jyothi was an Indian actress who appeared in South Indian films. She acted in over 50 films. She is known for films like Puthukavithai and Rail Payanangalil. Jyothi made a mark in acting through Vijaya T. Rajendher's Rayil Payanangalil and Rajinikanth starrer Puthu Kavithai.

Jyothi died of breast cancer at a private hospital in Chennai in 2007. She was 44. A divorcee, Jothi was staying with her daughter at suburban Neelangarai on the ECR and getting treatment for the last couple of years. She shot into the limelight when her maiden film "Rayil Payanangalil", directed by Vijaya T Rajendher, turned out to be a resounding success. She had also paired with Tamil Superstar Rajnikanth in "Pudukavithai", produced by Kavithalayaas in the mid-80s. A host of people from the Tamil film world paid their last respects to the actor, who had acted in over 50 films in Tamil and Telugu. Her body was cremated at Besant Nagar crematorium.

Partial filmography

Death
Affected with breast cancer, she was admitted to a private hospital in Chennai a few days before her death. She did not respond to the treatment and died on the night of 18 May 2007, at the age of 44. A divorcee, she was staying with her daughter at suburban Neelangarai on the ECR and getting treatment for the last couple of years. Her body was cremated at Besant Nagar crematorium.

References

External links 
 

Actresses in Telugu cinema
Indian film actresses
Actresses in Tamil cinema
1963 births
2007 deaths
Date of birth missing
Place of birth missing
Filmfare Awards South winners
20th-century Indian actresses
21st-century Indian actresses
Actresses from Chennai
Actresses in Malayalam cinema